William Sharkey may refer to:

 William L. Sharkey (1798–1873), American judge and politician
 William J. Sharkey (US Navy officer) (1885–1918), officer in the United States Navy during World War I
 William J. Sharkey (murderer) (1847–?), convicted murderer and minor New York City politician